Formica microphthalma is a species of ant in the family Formicidae.

References

Further reading

 
 
 
 
 

microphthalma
Insects described in 1973